Braddock Heights is an unincorporated community and census-designated place (CDP) in Frederick County, Maryland, United States. The population was 2,608 at the 2010 census. The local ZIP codes are 21714 (post office boxes only) and 21703.

History
Braddock Heights is located at an elevation of  atop Braddock Mountain (as Catoctin Mountain is locally known) near the pass at Braddock Springs, so named after British General Edward Braddock and Lt. Colonel George Washington's use of the mountain pass on their way to Fort Duquesne during the French and Indian War on April 29, 1755. During the Civil War, Braddock Heights was the site of a minor cavalry battle between generals J.E.B. Stuart (CSA) and Alfred Pleasonton (USA) on September 13, 1862; it was at that time known as "Fairview Pass". One mile east of Braddock Heights, near the base of Braddock Mountain, are the older communities of Clifton and Old Braddock.

The picturesque view of the city of Frederick from Old Braddock—also known as "Fairview", elevation —was the inspiration for Oliver Wendell Holmes, Sr. to record in his 1862 journal:

This journal entry was in turn an inspiration for Holmes' close friend John Greenleaf Whittier when composing the famous Civil War poem Barbara Fritchie.

Braddock Pass is near the locations at which Interstate 70 and the National Pike (U.S. Route 40) cross Catoctin Mountain. Braddock Heights was founded in 1896 by George William Smith as a summer resort community that eventually included several hotels, a community pool, a wooden-floor skating rink, an amusement park, scenic overlooks, nature trails, and until 1980, a small ski resort. Braddock Heights has been host to many national political figures, including Oliver Wendell Holmes, Sr., Edwin Warfield, President Franklin D. Roosevelt, Earl Warren, Ethel Kennedy, and (then) Senator Richard Nixon.

Braddock Heights was one of the first modern planned communities in the United States, and custom housing development has continued since 1901. Braddock Heights is now known for its eclectic houses (no two are alike) and its scenic views of Frederick and the Monocacy and Middletown valleys. Following the end of World War II and the decline of the amusement park, Braddock Heights' demographic changed from commercial summer boarding houses to that of an unincorporated community with permanent residents.

Braddock Heights, similar to the other Maryland cottage parks of Pen Mar and Glen Echo, has evolved into an artisans' community. The Braddock Heights Community Association and the Braddock Heights Historical Society continue to maintain and hold public events at Braddock Heights Park.

Braddock Heights was once home to the oldest roller rink in the United States, the Stargaze Skateway. It burned to the ground as the result of arson on August 18, 1998.

Braddock Heights is said to be the roost of the Snallygaster, a chimeric bird-like creature claimed to be responsible for the disappearance of livestock, and the occasional Middletown Valley resident, since the mid-18th century.

Hagerstown & Frederick Railway
The Hagerstown & Frederick Railway, a suburban (later interurban) trolley system, was developed by George William Smith and initially called the Frederick & Middletown Railway. Service between Frederick and Braddock Heights commenced on August 22, 1896. The Jefferson branch was added in 1906, running down the east side of Jefferson Boulevard. The right of way is still visible as a strip between the set-back sidewalk and the street.

Service to Jefferson lasted until 1940, although a short section was kept open to serve the Vindobona Hotel. Service to Braddock Heights and Middletown from Frederick was finally discontinued in 1946.

Geography
Braddock Heights is located in west-central Frederick County at  (39.420895, −77.504931), along the ridgecrest of Catoctin Mountain, known locally as "Braddock Mountain". U.S. Route 40 Alternate crosses the mountain near the center of the community, leading east  to Frederick and west  to Middletown. Interstate 70 crosses the northern part of the CDP, with access from partial Exit 49 (U.S. Route 40 Alt.) at the east base of the mountain. U.S. Route 40 forms the northern edge of the CDP.

Demographics

As of the census of 2000, there were 4,627 people, 1,684 households, and 1,343 families residing in the CDP. The racial makeup of the CDP was 96.17% White, 1.19% African American, 1.02% Asian, 0.02% Pacific Islander, 0.35% from other races, and 1.25% from two or more races. Hispanic or Latino of any race were 1.73% of the population.

There were 1,684 households, out of which 35.9% had children under the age of 18 living with them, 69.9% were married couples living together, 7.1% had a female householder with no husband present, and 20.2% were non-families. 15.0% of all households were made up of individuals, and 5.1% had someone living alone who was 65 years of age or older. The average household size was 2.71 and the average family size was 3.03.

In the CDP, the population was spread out, with 25.0% under the age of 18, 5.7% from 18 to 24, 26.9% from 25 to 44, 31.8% from 45 to 64, and 10.6% who were 65 years of age or older. The median age was 41 years. For every 100 females, there were 98.0 males. For every 100 females age 18 and over, there were 96.7 males.

The median income for a household in the CDP was $71,932, and the median income for a family was $78,779. Males had a median income of $52,179 versus $38,063 for females. The per capita income for the CDP was $29,621. About 1.0% of families and 2.2% of the population were below the poverty line, including none of those under age 18 and 2.4% of those age 65 or over.

Education
Braddock Heights is part of the Middletown School District.

In popular culture
 A third-season episode of the popular science fiction series The X-Files was set in Braddock Heights, but actually filmed in Vancouver, British Columbia.  The episode titled "Wetwired" aired on May 3, 1996.

References

Further reading

External links

 Braddock Heights Community Association
 Braddock Heights Historical Society
 2005 Washington Post Braddock Heights Article

Census-designated places in Frederick County, Maryland
Census-designated places in Maryland
Streetcar suburbs